North Queensland First is a political party founded and based in the state of Queensland by former Queensland MP for Whitsunday Jason Costigan. The party was created in late 2019 after Costigan was expelled from the Liberal National Party.

Foundation
After being expelled by the Liberal National Party, Independent MP for Whitsunday, Jason Costigan created the North Queensland First Party.

In response to the foundation of the new political party, Katter's Australian Party leader Robbie Katter said: "We are doers, we have left the others for dead in terms of what we have done. We can all talk a big game but it is about who will have a seat in Parliament."

Objective
In the published constitution of the party, it states three objectives of the party:

(a) to promote and deliver Self-Government and Statehood for North Queensland;
(b) the election of MPs to the Queensland Parliament;
(c) to give specific voice in the Queensland Parliament to the desires and expectations of the people of North Queensland.

The party's website states that "North Queensland First is a conservative, pro-North Queensland political party and believes that Queensland and Australia was founded on traditional Christian values, notwithstanding our respect for people from non-Christian backgrounds."

Electoral results

References

Conservative parties in Australia
Political parties established in 2019
2019 establishments in Australia